Zabrus melancholicus is a species of ground beetle in the Pterostichinae subfamily that can be found in such Asian countries as Armenia, Syria and Turkey.

Subspecies
There are three subspecies of Z. melancholicus:
 Z. melancholicus heinzi Jedlička, 1965
 Z. melancholicus melancholicus Schaum, 1864
 Z. melancholicus occidentalis Freude, 1989

References

Beetles described in 1864
Beetles of Asia
Zabrus
Taxa named by Hermann Rudolph Schaum